The 14th Annual Premios Juventud (Youth Awards) were broadcast by Univision on July 6, 2017.

The theme for this edition was "Betting on the Future" and focused more on music, removing categories awarding actors, telenovelas, and pop culture. It was hosted by Alejandra Espinoza and Danilo Carrera.

Performers

Winners and nominees 
The nominees for the 14th Premios Juventud were announced on May 19, 2017.

Special recognitions 
 Youth Idol Award - Enrique Iglesias
 Super Sonic Award - Maluma

Agentes de Cambio 
"Agentes de Cambio" are a group of young people who were recognized for their contributions to society through their different causes around the benefit of their community.
Dante Alvarado León
Iván Ceja
Justino Mora
Nalleli Cobo
Sarahí Espinoza Salamanca
Xiuhtezcatl Martínez

References

External links 
 

Premios Juventud
Premios Juventud
Premios Juventud
Premios Juventud
Premios Juventud
Premios Juventud
Premios Juventud
2010s in Miami